Langdon is a hamlet in southern Alberta, Canada under the jurisdiction of Rocky View County. It previously held village status between August 31, 1907, and January 1, 1946.

The hamlet is located in Census Division No. 6 and in the federal riding of Bow River.  The hamlet is represented in federal government by Member of Parliament Martin Shields and in municipal government by Councillor Al Schule.

History 
Langdon was named for R.B. Langdon of Langdon & Shepard, a Canadian Pacific Railway subcontracting firm who built a section of the line just east of Calgary. He was born in Vermont in 1826 and worked on the railroad lines within at least ten US states, notably the St. Paul & Pacific Railroad in 1858. Langdon served as a state senator in Minnesota from 1873 to 1881. The nearby Shepard station was named for his partner. Langdon was one of two people to turn the first sod in the settlement in 1882. A year later, a railway station was set up in a boxcar and named after him.

A post office was established on January 1, 1890, and a telegraph office in 1899. Langdon incorporated as a village on August 31, 1907. It subsequently dissolved on January 1, 1946, to become part of the Municipal District of Conrich No. 44.

Demographics 

The population of Langdon according to the 2018 municipal census conducted by Rocky View County is 5,364, a 9.5% increase from its 2013 municipal census population count of 4,897.

Attractions 
Langdon is home to The Track - a golf course formerly known as the Boulder Creek Golf Course.
To the North-West of Langdon is the wetland waterfowl habitat Weed Lake.

Education 
Langdon School provides education to students in kindergarten through grade 9. Sarah Thompson School provides education to students from K-5.

See also 
List of communities in Alberta
List of designated places in Alberta
List of former urban municipalities in Alberta
List of hamlets in Alberta

References 

Karamitsanis, Aphrodite (1992). Place Names of Alberta – Volume II, Southern Alberta, University of Calgary Press, Calgary, Alberta.

External links 
Langdon Chamber of Commerce
Langdon Community Association
 

Rocky View County
Hamlets in Alberta
Calgary Region
Designated places in Alberta
Former villages in Alberta